Jane or Jeanne Vialle (1906–1953) was a French journalist, politician and women's rights activist. She was a member of the French Resistance, and one of the first two black female senators in France.

Life
Jeanne Vialle was born in 1906 in Ouesco in Ubangi-Shari, a French colony which was part of French Equatorial Africa. She studied at the Lycée Jules-Ferry in Paris and gained her baccalauréat. Then she became a journalist at Opéra Mundi, an information agency. In 1940 she entered the resistance against the Nazi occupation of France. Arrested in Marseille in 1943 and jailed, she managed to escape before the war ended. She was awarded the Resistance Medal.

After the end of World War II, Vialle joined Agence France-Presse where she monitored the new relation between France and its colonies in the fourth French Republic. In July 1946 she founded her own political party, l'Evolution pour l ’Afrique Noire (APEAN; Association for Evolution of Black Africa). In January 1947 she was elected to the Council of the Republic representing Ubangui-Chari, and joined the socialist group there. She was re-elected in November 1948.

She died on 9 February 1953 in a plane accident in Villenave d’Ornon.

References

1906 births
1953 deaths
French Senators of the Fourth Republic
Women members of the Senate (France)
French women activists
French women's rights activists
People of French Equatorial Africa
20th-century French women